Durkheimian Studies (French: Études Durkheimiennes) is an annual peer-reviewed academic journal published by Berghahn Books on behalf of the British Centre for Durkheimian Studies. It covers research on all aspects of the work of Émile Durkheim and his group, as well as the contemporary development and application of their ideas to issues in the social sciences, religion, and philosophy.

Abstracting and indexing  
The journal is abstracted and indexed in:
 Anthropological Index
 International Bibliography of Book Reviews of Scholarly Literature on the Humanities and Social Sciences
 International Bibliography of Periodical Literature
 MLA International Bibliography
 Social Services Abstracts
 Sociological Abstracts
 Worldwide Political Science Abstracts

External links 
 

Sociology journals
Annual journals
Publications established in 1995
Multilingual journals
Berghahn Books academic journals